Ascenso MX was the second tier of professional football in Mexico of the Mexican football league system. The champion of the competition was promoted to Liga MX (top-flight tier). The bottom team was relegated to Liga Premier (the third tier). It was sponsored by BBVA through its Mexican subsidiary BBVA, and was officially known as Ascenso BBVA MX.

Formerly known as Primera División A (First Division A) the league rebranded in 2009 its name and competition format to Liga de Ascenso. It was rebranded in 2012 as Ascenso MX. The major changes: clubs do not need a FMF certification to be promoted and that the competition no longer used group stages.

Ascenso MX was replaced by Liga de Expansión MX on April 17, 2020.

History 
In 1994, to create a premier league, the Mexican Football Federation upgraded the Second Division to "Primera División A" (First Division A) to bring closer the level of play in the two tiers, Primera and Primera A. The project was under the direction of José Antonio García Rodríguez, then president of the then top-tier Primera Division. He envisioned the new division to be joined by the best teams of the Segunda and include teams from the United States (Los Angeles Salsa and San Jose Black Hawks expressed a desire to join). FIFA declined the integration but established a new league with the best Segunda División sides. The inaugural 1994-95 season began with 15 teams: Acapulco, Atlético Celaya, Atlético San Francisco, Atlético Yucatán, Caimanes de Tabasco, Coras de Tepic, Gallos de Aguascalientes, Halcones de Querétaro, Inter Tijuana, Irapuato, Reboceros de La Piedad, Marte, Pachuca, San Luis, and Zacatepec. Cobras de Ciudad Juárez declined to participate due to financial problems.

In 2006, the number of teams increased from 20 to 24, and geographically separated into two groups for preliminary competition (A and B).

In 2009, the major changes were: the name change from Primera División to Liga de Ascenso. The league was reduced to 17 teams and the groups were eliminated. Apertura 2010 had 18 teams participating. In 2012 the league was rebranded as Ascenso MX. In 2013 Alebrijes de Oaxaca was the 16th team of Ascenso MX. Alebrijes was partly formed by consolidating Segunda División side Tecamachalco which had won promotion to Ascenso MX in 2012, but did not fulfill infrastructural requirements set by the Mexican Football Federation. In August 2013, Club Zacatepec was promoted to Ascenso MX in place of relegated Pumas Morelos.

In Ascenso MX editions 2011–2016, no team was relegated to Segunda División de México Liga Premier de Ascenso. On June 6, 2016, returned 
to relegation to the Segunda División de México Liga Premier de Ascenso for the 2016–17 season. Loros UdeC and Murciélagos F.C. were relegated in the next two seasons. In 2018–19 season, Tampico Madero F.C. finished last in the relegation table, but remained in Ascenso MX after paying a bail.

2020 abolition
On April 13, Liga MX and Ascenso MX President Enrique Bonilla announced the termination of the remainder of the Clausura 2020 season. Two reasons were the 2019–20 coronavirus pandemic and the league's lack of financial resources. Its U17 and U20 youth systems and the Liga MX Femenil are also at risk.

Clubs 
The 2019–20 season had 14 clubs competing. However, the Clausura 2020 tournament had only 12 teams competing after the dissolution of Potros UAEM and Loros UdeC.

Champions 

† Teams currently in the Liga MX 
†† Teams currently in the Liga Premier 
††† Teams currently in the Amateur Levels 
†††† Defunct teams

Sponsorship

BBVA México was the league's sponsor, and used the brand name Ascenso BBVA MX. The official match ball is manufactured by Voit.

Promotion and relegation

† Teams currently in the Liga MX 
†† Teams currently in the Liga Premier 
††† Teams currently in the Amateur Levels 
†††† Defunct teams

Notes:
1976–77: Tampico Madero bought San Luis's spot in first division
1977–78: Deportivo Neza is bought Laguna and took its spot.
1981–82: Tampico Madero bought Atletas Campesinos and took over its spot
1983–84: Ángeles de Puebla bought Oaxtepec and took over its spot
1988–89: Tiburones Rojos de Veracruz bought Potros Neza  and took over its spot
1992–93: U.T. Neza changes its name to Toros Neza
1998–99: Puebla bought U.D Curtidores and took over its spot
1999–00: Irapuato gained automatic promotion as they won both tournaments.
2001–02: Veracruz gained automatic promotion due to expansion in first division
2009-10: Necaxa gained automatic promotion as they won both tournaments.
2012–13: Veracruz bought La Piedad's spot in first division
2013–14: Zacatepec bought Cruz Azul Hidalgo's spot in Ascenso MX.
2017–18: Tapachula were not certified to be promoted to Liga MX.

Top scorers

References

External links
 Official website

 
2
Mexico
Sports leagues established in 1994
Sports leagues disestablished in 2020
1994 establishments in Mexico
2020 disestablishments in Mexico
Professional sports leagues in Mexico